Lost Tapes is an American fiction television series that aired on Animal Planet. Produced by Go Go Luckey Entertainment, the program presents fictional found footage depicting traumatic encounters with creatures cryptozoological, supernatural, mythological or extraterrestrial. Creatures featured include Bigfoot, the chupacabra, vampires, werewolves, and reptilians.

The pilot ("Chupacabra") aired on Animal Planet on October 30, 2008, for Halloween, but the series officially premiered on January 6, 2009. Animal Planet commissioned a second season, which premiered on September 29, 2009. Season 3 premiered on September 28, 2010, with episodes featuring creatures such as zombies and the Kraken. The show also used to air on Planet Green.

Overview
Lost Tapes depicts traumatic scenarios where people are attacked and/or killed by mysterious, dangerous, deadly, wild, and ferocious paranormal cryptids. The series is shot in a mockumentary style. Most episodes begin with a quick introduction of facts, which include interviews with experts explaining scientific theories or facts and folklore behind the episode's titular creature. In the second season, some episodes began with footage of a person being attacked and often killed by the episode's creature, an introduction meant to set up the events of each episode. In the third season, every episode had such an introduction, though the events of every episode in all three seasons are accompanied by videos of scientists, cryptozoologists, and folklorists giving their very thoughts and opinions of the creatures, which are called Lost Tapes: Revelations.

Episodes

Critical reception

Lost Tapes has received mixed reviews from critics. In a review of the season one DVD, TV Squad writer John Scott Lewinski gave the series a mostly unfavorable review, stating that in the case of this series, "Animal Planet could be accused of repacking a horror/sci-fi show as an animal documentary" and that much of the program is "outright bollocks." He did, however, state that the show holds some appeal for audiences looking for a scare, or "incredibly gullible people." Emily Ashby of Common Sense Media gave the series three out of five stars, noting that while the acting was "subpar", the show overall was "simultaneously scintillating and bone-chilling."

See also
Found footage
Cryptozoology
Cryptid
Monsters and Mysteries in America

References

External links

Animal Planet original programming
Cryptozoological television series
2000s American horror television series
2010s American horror television series
2000s American mockumentary television series
2010s American mockumentary television series
2008 American television series debuts
2010 American television series endings
English-language television shows